Minmini is a 1953 Indian Tamil-language film directed by T. V. Ramnath and Krishnaswamy. The film stars Vijayakumar and Mangalam.

Plot
The film depicts the life story of Lakshmikanthan who was a film journalist and the editor of Hindu Nesan.

Cast
List adapted from the database of Film News Anandan.

Male cast
Vijayakumar
Krishna Sarma
T. K. Kalyanam
Chitra Krishnaswamy

Female cast
Mangalam
Menaka

Production
The film was produced under the banner R. A. S. Tennekone productions and directed by T. V. Ramnath and Krishnaswamy. T. S. S. Mani wrote the story and dialogues. Cinematography was handled by V. Rajagopal. P. S. Gopalakrishnan and Sampath Kumar were in charge of choreography. The film was produced at Vijaya Vauhini Studios. R. A. S. Tennekone was a Sri Lankan.

Soundtrack
Lyrics were penned by Kalki. (Music composer and playback singers are not known).

List of songs

Maaya Vallavan Kannan
Aaha Endhan Inbam Neeye
Sathyame Jayamae Thaane
Maharaajaave Inge Vaareer
Yaen Pirandheno Puviyil
Thagumaa Eesa Idhu Un Thiruvilaiyaadal
Sugame Tharumae Solaithaan Sobhithame
Kaadhal Niraindha Vaazhve Vaazhvome

References

Indian drama films
Indian films based on actual events
1950s Tamil-language films